Matthew Jesse Ware (born December 2, 1982) is a former American football safety. He was drafted in the third round with the 89th pick in the 2004 NFL Draft by the Philadelphia Eagles. He played college football at UCLA.

He  also played for the Arizona Cardinals, Virginia Destroyers and Toronto Argonauts.

Baseball career

Seattle Mariners
Ware was drafted by the Seattle Mariners in the 21st round of the 2001 MLB Draft. He played for the Peoria Mariners during the 2001 and 2002 seasons.

Football career

Philadelphia Eagles
Ware was drafted by the Philadelphia Eagles in the 2004 NFL Draft. In 2005, he recorded a game-winning touchdown against the San Diego Chargers when he recovered the ball after a blocked Chargers field goal and carried it to the end zone. He was released on September 2, 2006.

Arizona Cardinals
On September 3, 2006, Ware was claimed off waivers by the Arizona Cardinals. On December 16, 2009, he was placed on injured reserve due to a knee injury.

Ware was released by Arizona on September 2, 2011.

Toronto Argonauts
Ware spent two years away from football, working as a personal trainer and fire fighter, before signing with the Toronto Argonauts of the CFL.

References

External links
Arizona Cardinals bio
UCLA Bruins football bio
Toronto Argonauts bio

1982 births
Living people
African-American players of American football
African-American players of Canadian football
American football cornerbacks
Canadian football defensive backs
UCLA Bruins football players
Philadelphia Eagles players
Arizona Cardinals players
Arizona League Mariners players
Toronto Argonauts players
Virginia Destroyers players
21st-century African-American sportspeople
20th-century African-American people
Ed Block Courage Award recipients